Roger Ellwood Cloud (December 4, 1909 – April 20, 1988), was an American politician of the Republican party who represented Ohio in several capacities.

Having worked as a farmer and a factory worker, Cloud won election to the local school board in DeGraff. In 1940, he won office as a county commissioner in Logan County, Ohio. He served in this office from 1941 to 1949.

In 1948, Cloud ran successfully for a seat in the Ohio House of Representatives, serving from 1949. Cloud held the office of Speaker of the House from 1955 to 1959 and from 1961 to 1967.

In 1965, Ohio State Auditor Roger W. Tracy died and Governor James A. Rhodes appointed Chester W. Goble as a temporary replacement. Rhodes chose Cloud to complete Tracy's term as auditor and in 1966, Cloud was elected to the position and served in that office from 1967 to 1971.

In 1970, Cloud was nominated for Governor of Ohio as incumbent Jim Rhodes was term-limited. He defeated Congressman Donald "Buz" Lukens in the primary, but lost to Democrat John J. Gilligan. That year the Ohio Republican Party was caught up in the "Crofters" scandal where the Republican state treasurer, John Herbert, had invested state money in improper investments with a big campaign contributor. After this defeat, Cloud retired from politics.

Cloud's wife was the former Llewellyn DeWeese; they were married in 1934.

See also

 Election Results, Ohio Governor
 Election Results, Ohio State Auditor

References

1909 births
1988 deaths
People from Logan County, Ohio
County commissioners in Ohio
Speakers of the Ohio House of Representatives
Republican Party members of the Ohio House of Representatives
State Auditors of Ohio
Burials at Green Lawn Cemetery (Columbus, Ohio)
20th-century American politicians